Serra da Marofa is a mountain ridge located in the municipality of Figueira de Castelo Rodrigo, Guarda district, Central Portugal reaching  in altitude. In 1956, a statue of Christ the King was built on top of the mountain range.

References

Mountain ranges of Portugal
Geography of Guarda District